Newcastle, an electoral district of the Legislative Assembly in the Australian state of New South Wales, has had two incarnations, from 1859 until 1894 and from 1904 to the present.


Election results

Elections in the 2010s

2019

2015

2014 by-election

2011

Elections in the 2000s

2007

2003

Elections in the 1990s

1999

1995

1991

Elections in the 1980s

1988

1984

1981

Elections in the 1970s

1978

1976

1973

1971

Elections in the 1960s

1968

1965

1962

Elections in the 1950s

1959

1956

1953

1950

Elections in the 1940s

1947

1944

1941

Elections in the 1930s

1938

1935

1932

1930

Elections in the 1920s

1927
This section is an excerpt from 1927 New South Wales state election § Newcastle

1925
This section is an excerpt from 1925 New South Wales state election § Newcastle

1922
This section is an excerpt from 1922 New South Wales state election § Newcastle

1921 appointment
William Kearsley died on 19 June 1921. Between 1920 and 1927 the Legislative Assembly was elected using a form of proportional representation with multi-member seats and a single transferable vote (modified Hare-Clark). The Parliamentary Elections (Casual Vacancies) Act, provided that casual vacancies were filled by the next unsuccessful candidate on the incumbent member's party list. David Murray had the most votes of the unsuccessful  candidates at the 1920 election and took his seat on 30 August 1921.

1920
This section is an excerpt from 1920 New South Wales state election § Newcastle

Elections in the 1910s

1917
This section is an excerpt from 1917 New South Wales state election § Newcastle

1913
This section is an excerpt from 1913 New South Wales state election § Newcastle

1910
This section is an excerpt from 1910 New South Wales state election § Newcastle

Elections in the 1900s

1907
This section is an excerpt from 1907 New South Wales state election § Newcastle

1904
This section is an excerpt from 1904 New South Wales state election § Newcastle

1894-1904

1891
This section is an excerpt from 1891 New South Wales colonial election § Newcastle

1891 by-election

Elections in the 1880s

1889 by-election

1889
This section is an excerpt from 1889 New South Wales colonial election § Newcastle

1887
This section is an excerpt from 1887 New South Wales colonial election § Newcastle

1885
This section is an excerpt from 1885 New South Wales colonial election § Newcastle

1882
This section is an excerpt from 1882 New South Wales colonial election § Newcastle

1880
This section is an excerpt from 1880 New South Wales colonial election § Newcastle

Elections in the 1870s

1877
This section is an excerpt from 1877 New South Wales colonial election § Newcastle

1874-75
This section is an excerpt from 1874-75 New South Wales colonial election § Newcastle

1872 by-election

1872
This section is an excerpt from 1872 New South Wales colonial election § Newcastle

Elections in the 1860s

1869-70
This section is an excerpt from 1869-70 New South Wales colonial election § Newcastle

1864-65
This section is an excerpt from 1864–65 New South Wales colonial election § Newcastle

1860
This section is an excerpt from 1860 New South Wales colonial election § Newcastle

Elections in the 1850s

1859
This section is an excerpt from 1859 New South Wales colonial election § Newcastle

Notes

References

New South Wales state electoral results by district